Burnett House or Burnette House may refer to:

in Australia
 Burnett House (Darwin, Northern Territory), heritage building

in the United States (by state then town)
 Burnett House (Searcy, Arkansas), listed on the National Register of Historic Places (NRHP) in White County
 Burnett House (Orlando, Florida), the official residence of the President of the University of Central Florida
H. C. Burnett House, Boise, Idaho, NRHP-listed in Ada County
Burnett-Montgomery House, Fairfield, Iowa, NRHP-listed in Jefferson County
Aubrey Burnett House, Oakland, Kentucky, NRHP-listed in Warren County 
Parker-Burnett House, Somerville, Massachusetts, NRHP-listed
Edgar A. Burnett House, Lincoln, Nebraska, NRHP-listed in Lancaster County
Southerland-Burnette House, Mount Olive, North Carolina, NRHP-listed in Wayne County
Worsley-Burnette House, Conetoe, North Carolina, NRHP-listed in Edgecombe County
William Burnett House, Washington Court House, Ohio, NRHP-listed in Fayette County
Burnett House (Houston, Texas), NRHP-listed in Harris County
Burk Burnett Building, Fort Worth, Texas, NRHP-listed in Tarrant County